Ge Tian (born 25 December 1988) is a Chinese actress and fashion model.

Biography

Early life
Ge Tian was born in Jinan, Shandong, on December 25, 1988. In 2012 she graduated from Central Academy of Drama, majoring in acting.

Acting career
Ge Tian began her career as a fashion model in 2005. A year later, she has become the first official tourism ambassador of Shandong province.

In 2011, Ge Tian played Thierry Mena in William Mesguich's drama The Cynic, based on Molière's novel.

After college, she appeared in many television series and films, such as One Mile Above, The VI Group of Fatal Case, and Leaves in Changan.

In 2012, she starred in the romantic comedy television series Youth Explosion, alongside Lei Qingyao, Wang Chuang, and Chu Nan.

Ge Tian first rose to prominence in 2015 for playing Yin Hua in the historical television series Anti Japanese Together. The series received mixed reviews. That same year, she starred in the suspense thriller film Nowhere to Run with Zhang Duo, Liu Ying, and Sui Yongliang.

Personal life
On September 8, 2014, Ge Tian married former Olympic hurdler Liu Xiang, one of China's best-known athletes. They divorced on June 25, 2015, after nine months and seventeen days of marriage.

Works

Film

Television

References

1988 births
Actresses from Jinan
Living people
Chinese film actresses
Chinese television actresses
Chinese female models
Central Academy of Drama alumni